Stranger to Stranger is the first and only album by American new wave band Industry released on Capitol Records and distributed by EMI in 1983. A Philippine CD version was later released and included an extended version of "Still of the Night".

The album features the most successful track "State of the Nation", an anti-war song that broke into European charts. It was a minor hit in the U.S., peaking at #81 at the Billboard Hot 100. However, it was a bigger hit in Europe and peaked at number ten in Sweden. The album peaked at #48 in Sweden.

After this album, Jon Carin started a successful solo and session musician career, becoming a permanent member of the Pink Floyd live band and co-writing Pink Floyd's hit single "Learning to Fly". Unger and Perrone went on to form their own bands.

Track listing
Side one
"Still of the Night" (Jon Carin) - 4:06
"Until We're Together" (Jon Carin, Rudy Perrone) - 3:59
"Romantic Dreams" (Jon Carin) - 3:53
"What Have I Got to Lose" (Jon Carin) - 4:03
"State of the Nation" (Jon Carin, Mercury Caronia) - 4:33

Side two
"Shangri-La" (Rudy Perrone) - 3:47
"Communication" (Jon Carin, Mercury Caronia) - 4:05
"All I Need Is You" (Jon Carin, Mercury Caronia, Rudy Perrone) - 2:55
"Stranger in a Strange Land" (Jon Carin) - 5:18
"Living Alone Too Long" (Brian Unger) - 4:07

Personnel
Industry
Jon Carin - lead vocals, keyboards, synthesizer; acoustic guitar and "final bass pops" on "Until We're Together"
Brian Unger - guitar, vocals
Rudy Perrone - guitar, bass, vocals; lead vocals on "Shangri-La"
Mercury Caronia - drums, electronic percussion, vocals
with:
Vini Poncia - "virtuoso" tambourine on "What Have I Got to Lose"

Catalog number and format
Catalog: ST-12316
Format: Vinyl, LP, Album

Notes
Produced and engineered by Rhett Davies for EG Management Ltd.
Mixed By - Bob Clearmountain, Bob Schaper
Additional Production - Vini Poncia
Engineered by Rhett Davies and Ray Niznik at Bearsville Sound, NY.
Overdubs, mix and sweat by Dr. Bob Schaper at Boogie Hotel, Long Island, NY.
Mastered by George Marino at Sterling Sound, NYC.

References

1983 albums
Industry (American band) albums
Albums produced by Rhett Davies
Capitol Records albums